A hazard is an agent which has the potential to cause harm to a vulnerable target.

Hazard may also refer to:

Comics and anime
 El-Hazard, a Japanese anime series and franchise including a manga adaptation
 Hazard (DC Comics), a character in the Injustice Society
 Hazard (Wildstorm), a Wildstorm series
 Jenos Hazard, a character in Black Cat manga

Film and television
 Hazard (1921 film), a German silent film
 Hazard (1948 film)
 Hazard (2005 film)
 Hazard, a middleweight battlebot from the TV series BattleBots

Gaming
 Hazard (game), a game of chance
 Hazard (golf)
 Hazard (Judges Guild), a 1980 supplement to the role-playing game Superhero: 2044
 Hazard, a term in cue sports

Music
Hazard (musician), stage name of B. J. Nilsen, Swedish sound artist
Hazard (song), a 1991 song by Richard Marx

People
 Hazard (surname)
 Hazard Stevens (1842–1918), American soldier awarded the Medal of Honor, politician, mountaineer who made the first documented climb of Mount Rainier, and writer

Places
In the United States
Hazard, Kentucky, a city
Hazard, Nebraska, a village
Hazard, Washington, an unincorporated community

Elsewhere
The Hazards, a mountain range in Tasmania

Ships
 Hazard (ship), a sloop wrecked off Broken Bay, Australia in 1809
 HMS Hazard, several Royal Navy ships
 USS Hazard (AM-240), a US Navy minesweeper

Other uses
 Hazard (computer architecture)
 Hazard (logic)
 Hazards (magazine), an occupational safety and health magazine
 Hazards, a type of automotive lighting
 Hazard Farmstead (Joyner Site RI-706), an archeological site in Jamestown, Rhode Island
 Hazard function, used in Survival analysis

See also
 
 
 Hazzard (disambiguation)